Wine on Tap is a distribution method for wine. Instead of distributing via the bottle, wine is housed in stainless steel kegs or disposable one-way kegs. After the barreling stage, the wine is transferred into the kegs holding about 27 bottles of wine each (or 130 glasses) depending on the size of the keg (10 liters). It is pushed out of the keg by gases such as nitrogen, argon or in case keykeg with compressed air, gas further providing a blanket over the wine and protecting it from oxidation. This is not necessary with keykeg. Recent changes in the wine industry made it possible to tap wine from keykeg by a compressor or handpump. This means that no nitrogen or argon is needed.

Wine on tap utilizes cost savings at all levels, from the manufacturer, retailer, and consumer. Traditionally, wine retailers have served wine by the glass by opening and resealing individual bottles.  With wine on tap, bottle, cork, and carton costs are eliminated.  Costs of waste from throwing away oxidized wine are also decreased and fresher unoxidized wine is delivered to the consumer. Transport costs are significantly reduced as well, as the same amount of wine weighs significantly more in bottles than in a keg. Further, the disposable one way kegs require even less transportation than steel kegs because they are disposable and recyclable.

The aging process does not occur in the keg when the wine is blanketed with a gas such as nitrogen or argon to pressurize the keg. Wines not in need of significant aging times are best placed to be housed in kegs.

References 

 Wine packaging and storage